The Bira is a river in the Jewish Autonomous Oblast, Russia. The name derives from the Jurchen and Manchu word bira meaning "river". It is one of the largest, left tributaries of the Amur.

Some of the cities that lie along the river are Birakan, Teploozyorsk, Londoko, Bira, Birobidzhan and Nadezhdinskoye.

See also
List of rivers of Russia

References

External links

Rivers of Jewish Autonomous Oblast